The discography of Madness, a British pop/ska band, comprises twelve studio albums, sixteen compilation albums, four live albums, two soundtrack albums, two extended plays, four box sets and forty-three singles.

Albums

Studio albums

Live albums

Soundtrack albums

Compilation albums

Extended plays

Box sets

Singles

Video albums
1982: Complete Madness
1986: Utter Madness
1992: Divine Madness
1992: Madstock!
1998: Madstock! 4

See also
 Suggs#Solo discography

References

External links
Official website
Official Myspace

Discography
Discographies of British artists
Pop music group discographies
New wave discographies